Bina Venkataraman (born October 11, 1979) is an American science policy expert and journalist. She is currently the Editorial Page Editor of The Boston Globe and a fellow at the New America Foundation. She previously served as a senior advisor for Climate Change Innovation under President Barack Obama's administration and advised the President's Council of Advisors on Science and Technology on the Ebola epidemic.

Early life and career 
Venkataraman was born in 1979 to Indian immigrants and grew up in Wooster, Ohio. She was valedictorian of her class at Wooster High School.

Venkataraman received her Bachelor of Arts degree from Brown University in 2002, studying International Relations and Environmental Studies. She then received a Fulbright Program Fellowship and worked as a Communications and Research Coordinator at the Rainforest Alliance from 2002 to 2005. There, she coordinated public-facing campaigns geared towards rainforest conservation, including a campaign to raise awareness around sustainable coffee and another to promote sustainable tourism. Venkataraman then became a Writing and Research Fellow through Princeton in Asia, working in Hanoi, Vietnam as a public health grant writer for an HIV/AIDS clinic.

In 2006, Venkataraman began studying Public Policy at the Harvard Kennedy School, where she received her Master's degree in 2008.

Public policy 
From 2010 to 2019, Venkataraman served as the Director of Global Policy Initiatives at the Broad Institute of Harvard University and Massachusetts Institute of Technology. During that time, she served as Senior Adviser to Eric Lander, while he was co-chair of the President's Council of Advisors on Science and Technology (PCAST). In that capacity, she co-authored a number of reports for the PCAST, including a 2010 report on K-12 education in Science, Technology, Engineering, and Mathematics (STEM), a 2011 report on ensuring American leadership in advanced manufacturing, and a 2012 report on drug discovery, develop and evaluation. From 2013 to 2015, she took a sabbatical to work in the White House under President Barack Obama. There, she served as a senior advisor for climate change innovation and also worked to address the Ebola virus disease epidemic between 2014 and 2015.

She serves on Brown University's Institute for Environment and Society as well as Brown's President's Leadership Council, advising Christina Hull Paxson. She is also a Future Tense and Carnegie Fellow at the New America Foundation.

Writing and public engagement 
Venkataraman is also a writer, focusing on climate change, environmental justice, and public health. Her work has been published in outlets like Slate, The Washington Post, and Time. From 2006 to 2010, she worked on the science desk at The New York Times and The Boston Globe, first as a James Reston Fellow and then as a reporter. She is now the Editorial Page Editor of The Boston Globe. In this role, Venkataraman has noted she aims to showcase the "diverse voices of our city and better showcase Boston’s groundbreaking ideas and knowledge, while holding our leaders and institutions accountable for meeting high expectations for public service." In March 2020, she oversaw the Editorial Board's criticism of Donald Trump's response to the coronavirus disease 2019 (COVID-19) pandemic in the United States.

In August 2019, she published her first book, The Optimist's Telescope: Thinking Ahead in a Reckless Age, which explores how human societies can overcome shortsightedness to tackle emerging threats—from climate change to antibiotic-resistant superbugs—to better plan for the future. The book draws from research in biology, psychology, and economics to make the case that humans can better plan for the future by adopting certain practices.

Venkataraman has also appeared on the TED mainstage and the Aspen Ideas Festival.

In 2021, she founded The Emancipator with Ibram X. Kendi of Boston University.

Selected works 

 The Optimist's Telescope: Thinking Ahead in a Reckless Age (Aug 2019) 
"Why we still need climate optimism" (Sep 19, 2019) The Washington Post
"Challenge for a Reckless Age: Be Better Ancestors" (Sept 23, 2019) Grist

Awards and honors 
 Global Young Leader, French-American Foundation (2015)
  Honorary Doctorate of Humane Letters, University of Southern California (2022)

References

External links 
 

1970s births
Living people
The Boston Globe people
Harvard Kennedy School alumni
Brown University alumni
Broad Institute people
American environmentalists
American science journalists
Obama administration personnel
American women writers of Indian descent